Admiral Vijai Singh Shekhawat, PVSM, AVSM, VrC, ADC is a former Chief of Naval Staff of the Indian Navy. He was 15th Chief of Naval Staff and served as Navy Chief from September-30 1993 to September-30 1996.
Admiral Shekhawat is a Patron of the General K.S. Thimayya Memorial Trust.

Early life and education 
Shekhawat attended the St. Joseph's Academy and Colonel Brown Cambridge School in Dehradun, Bishop Cotton Boys' School in Bangalore, and St Joseph's College in Darjeeling. He later attended the National Defence Academy in Maharashtra and the US Naval War College in Newport, Rhode Island.  Shekhawat was selected for the Joint Services Wing of the National Defence Academy (NDA) in 1952, and was awarded the President Gold Medal for the best all-round cadet in December 1953. He was commissioned in 1956.

Naval career

Early career
Shekhawat received submarine training in the UK from 1963–1964 and the USSR from 1966–1967, He served as Executive and Commanding Officer for several submarines, including the INS Kalvari and the INS Karanj, which he commissioned and sailed from the Baltic Sea to India. He received the Vir Chakra gallantry award for his service as commander of the Karanj during the Indo-Pakistani War of 1971.

Vir Chakra
The citation for the Vir Chakra reads as follows:

Promoted to substantive commander on 31 December 1971, Shekhawat served as director of the Indian Navy Submarine Arm from 1975 to 1977. After attending the US Naval War College from 1977 to 1978, Shekhawat was promoted captain on 1 July 1978, and served from 1979 to 1981 as the Chief Instructor at the National Defence Academy.

Flag Rank
Shekhawat was promoted to acting Rear Admiral on 21 June 1984 (substantive from 30 June), and served as the Assistant Chief of Naval Staff. He was given command of the Western Fleet during Operation Brasstacks. He was promoted Vice Admiral on 8 August 1988, with appointment as Director General of the tri-service Defence Planning Staff. and obtained the rank of Flag Officer Commanding-in-Chief of the Eastern Naval Command in December 1990. In 1992, Shekhawat was promoted to the Vice Chief of the Naval Staff, and in September 1993 he was again promoted to Chief of the Naval Staff.

Shekhawat retired in 1996.  Admiral Shekhawat is married to Mrs. Binu Shekhawat and has two sons, one of whom is a pilot with the Indian Navy.

Awards and decorations

References

Chiefs of the Naval Staff (India)
Vice Chiefs of Naval Staff (India)
Indian Navy admirals
Flag Officers Commanding Western Fleet
Shekhawat, V.S.
Bishop Cotton Boys' School alumni
Living people
1933 births
Submariners
Recipients of the Param Vishisht Seva Medal
Recipients of the Ati Vishisht Seva Medal
Recipients of the Vir Chakra